The 1993–94 NBA season was the Magic's fifth season in the National Basketball Association. The team narrowly missed the playoffs the previous season, but as a result, received unexpected good fortune. Despite having the worst odds, the Magic won the NBA Draft Lottery for the second consecutive season. The Magic drafted Chris Webber from the University of Michigan with the first overall pick in the 1993 NBA draft. They would eventually swap Webber to the Golden State Warriors in exchange for the rights to University of Memphis guard Penny Hardaway and three future first round picks.

With the addition of Hardaway, the Magic acquired a guard who could get second-year star Shaquille O'Neal the ball more often. Under new head coach Brian Hill, the Magic continued to improve holding a 27–20 record at the All-Star break, while posting a 7-game winning streak in February. At midseason, the team signed assistant coach Tree Rollins to a player contract, and acquired second-year forward Anthony Avent from the Milwaukee Bucks. The Magic qualified for the playoffs for the first time in franchise history, as the club finished with a record of 50 wins and 32 losses, which was good enough for 2nd place in the Atlantic Division.

O'Neal continued to dominate the league in scoring as he averaged 29.3 points, 13.2 rebounds and 2.9 blocks per game, was named to the All-NBA Third Team, and selected for the 1994 NBA All-Star Game, while Hardaway had a stellar rookie season, averaging 16.0 points, 5.4 rebounds, 6.6 assists and 2.3 steals per game, and was named to the NBA All-Rookie First Team. In addition, Nick Anderson provided the team with 15.8 points, 5.9 rebounds and 1.7 steals per game, while three-point specialist Dennis Scott contributed 12.8 points per game and led the team with 155 three-point field goals, and Scott Skiles provided with 9.9 points and 6.1 assists per game. O'Neal finished in fourth place in Most Valuable Player voting, and Hardaway finished in second place in Rookie of the Year voting behind Webber.

However, in the Eastern Conference First Round of the playoffs, the Magic would struggle losing their first 2 games at home to the 5th-seeded Indiana Pacers by a total of 3 points, as Shaq's weakness at the free throw line was exposed. In the end, the Magic were swept by the Pacers in 3 straight. Following the season, Skiles was traded to the Washington Bullets.

Offseason
 Chris Webber was selected by the Orlando Magic with the first pick of the 1993 NBA draft, becoming the first sophomore since Magic Johnson to be a #1 overall draft pick. The Magic immediately traded him to the Golden State Warriors in exchange for Penny Hardaway and three future first round draft picks.

Draft picks

Roster

Roster Notes
 Center Tree Rollins was a player-coach during the season.

Regular season
 Penny Hardaway started out the season at the shooting guard position while he learned the point guard position from veteran Scott Skiles. By mid-season he took over point guard duties from Skiles. He immediately made an impact on the league, winning the MVP award at the inaugural Schick Rookie Game. Hardaway helped the Magic to their first playoff berth and first fifty-win season. He averaged 16 points, 6.6 assists, 5.4 rebounds per game while his 190 steals ranked 6th in the league. He recorded his first career triple double on April 15 when he registered 14 points, 12 assists, and 11 rebounds against the Boston Celtics. For his efforts he was named to the NBA All-Rookie First Team, and was the runner-up for Rookie of the Year to the aforementioned Webber.

Season standings

z – clinched division title
y – clinched division title
x – clinched playoff spot

Record vs. opponents

Game log

Playoffs

|- align="center" bgcolor="#ffcccc"
| 1
| April 28
| Indiana
| L 88–89
| Shaquille O'Neal (24)
| Shaquille O'Neal (19)
| Penny Hardaway (10)
| Orlando Arena15,291
| 0–1
|- align="center" bgcolor="#ffcccc"
| 2
| April 30
| Indiana
| L 101–103
| Penny Hardaway (31)
| three players tied (7)
| Penny Hardaway (7)
| Orlando Arena15,291
| 0–2
|- align="center" bgcolor="#ffcccc"
| 3
| May 2
| @ Indiana
| L 86–99
| Shaquille O'Neal (23)
| Shaquille O'Neal (14)
| Penny Hardaway (4)
| Market Square Arena16,562
| 0–3
|-

Player statistics

NOTE: Please write the players statistics in alphabetical order by last name.

Season

Playoffs

Awards and honors
 Shaquille O'Neal – All-NBA 3rd team, Field goal percentage leader, All-Star
 Penny Hardaway – All-Rookie 1st Team, Schick Rookie Challenge MVP

Transactions

References

 Orlando Magic on Database Basketball
 Orlando Magic on Basketball Reference

Orlando Magic seasons
1993 in sports in Florida
1994 in sports in Florida